The Hoffman Auto Showroom was an automobile dealership at 430 Park Avenue, New York City.  Designed by architect Frank Lloyd Wright for notable European importer Max Hoffman in 1954, the glass and steel  space was located on the ground floor of an office tower located between East 55th and 56th Streets.  It was dominated by a sloping floor capable of displaying up to five automobiles.  

Hoffman, the son of a Vienna Rolls-Royce dealer, had intended to use it for his Jaguar dealership.  However, by its completion he had moved on to Mercedes Benz and a large model of a leaping jaguar had to be sent back to Coventry.

In early April 2013, the building's owners, Midwood Investment & Management and Oestreicher Properties, demolished the showroom to make way for a TD Bank branch office.

References
 
 

Frank Lloyd Wright buildings
Commercial buildings completed in 1957
1957 establishments in New York City
2013 disestablishments in New York (state)
Park Avenue
Midtown Manhattan